The Strange Powers House is a historic house located at 338 North Main Street in Prairie du Chien, Wisconsin, United States. It is historically significant as a rare example of fur-trade period French colonial style architecture which has survived intact and on its original site.

Description and history 
The timber and log structure is a characteristic example of French-Canadian piece sur piece a tenon en coulisse construction. It was added to the National Register of Historic Places on August 27, 1979.

See also
List of the oldest buildings in Wisconsin

References

Prairie du Chien, Wisconsin
Houses in Crawford County, Wisconsin
Houses completed in 1824
Houses on the National Register of Historic Places in Wisconsin
National Register of Historic Places in Crawford County, Wisconsin